"Only You" is a song by Swedish singer Zara Larsson. It was released on 11 August 2017, as the eighth and final single from Larsson's second studio album, So Good (2017). The song lyrically is about sexual fulfillment and masturbation. In Germany, Austria and Switzerland, the single features Nena, and in France and Canada, it features Olivier Dion.

Composition 
"Only You" is a midtempo pop and "quasi-reggae" song with a length of three minutes and forty two seconds. The song is in the key of F minor, and moves at a tempo of 165 beats per minute in a 4/4 time signature. The song contains "tongue-in-cheek" lyrics about sexual fulfillment and masturbation. The song was compared to the works of Rihanna.

Critical reception
Jonathan Currinn of Outlet Magazine praised the song, calling it a "total upgrade from the past two songs" on the album. Mike Wass of Idolator was far more critical of the song, calling it "the worst song on the album." He additionally called the drop a "hot mess."

Track listing

Personnel
Taken from Tidal.
 Zara Larsson – vocals
 Michael Richard Flygare – composition
 P. Marklund – composition
 Tobias "Astma" Jimson – composition, production, recording engineer
 Joakim Berg – composition, guitar
 MACK – composition, production
 Phil Tan – mixing engineer
 Bill Zimmerman – mixing engineer
 Michelle Mancini – mastering engineer
 Maria Hazell – backing vocals

Charts

Weekly charts

Year-end charts

Certifications

Release history

References

2017 songs
2017 singles
Zara Larsson songs
Epic Records singles
Sony Music singles
Songs written by Joakim Berg
Songs written by Marcus Sepehrmanesh
Songs written by Petra Marklund